Elaine Kudo is a ballet dancer and choreographer.  She is the ballet master at the Washington Ballet and was formerly a ballet mistress at the American Repertory Ballet.  She danced formerly with the American Ballet Theatre as a soloist, "excelling" in Twyla Tharp's choreography.

References

Ballerinas
American Ballet Theatre dancers
Living people
Ballet choreographers
Year of birth missing (living people)